New War is an Australian rock band based in Melbourne. They play dub-tinged  punk.

Line-up
Bass: Melissa Lock
Drums: Steve Masterton
Keyboard: Jesse Shepherd
Vocals: Chris Pugmire

History
Pugmire and Lock, both formerly of the Seattle punk band Shoplifting, formed New War over four years. Their first release was the single "Ghostwalking" in 2011 on Fast Weapons.

Albums
They released their self-titled debut album in 2013 with ATP Recordings.

Their second album, Coin, was released in 2018 by It Records.

Trouble In The Air, their third album, was commissioned by the City of Melbourne and recorded live at Melbourne Town Hall in 2017, with keyboardist Jesse Shepherd playing the town hall organ. It was released on February 28, 2020 by Heavy Machinery Records and was album of the week in The Age.

References

Australian punk rock groups
Musical groups from Melbourne
Musical groups established in the 2010s
ATP Recordings artists